The Lord of the Rings: The Rings of Power is an American fantasy television series developed by J. D. Payne and Patrick McKay for the streaming service Amazon Prime Video. Based on the novel The Lord of the Rings and its appendices by J. R. R. Tolkien, the series is set thousands of years before Tolkien's The Hobbit and The Lord of the Rings and depicts the major events of Middle-earth's Second Age. It is produced by Amazon Studios in association with New Line Cinema and in consultation with the Tolkien Estate.

Amazon bought the television rights for The Lord of the Rings from the Tolkien Estate in November 2017, making a five-season production commitment worth at least . This would make it the most expensive television series ever made. Payne and McKay were hired in July 2018. The series is primarily based on the appendices of The Lord of the Rings, which include discussion of the Second Age. Tolkien's grandson Simon Tolkien was consulted on the development of the series. Per the requirements of Amazon's deal with the Tolkien Estate, it is not a continuation of Peter Jackson's The Lord of the Rings and The Hobbit film trilogies. Despite this, the production intended to evoke the films using similar production design, younger versions of characters from the films, and a main theme by Howard Shore who composed the music for both trilogies. Bear McCreary composed the series' score.

A large international cast was hired, and filming for the eight-episode first season took place in New Zealand, where the films were produced, from February 2020 to August 2021 (with a production break of several months during that time due to the COVID-19 pandemic). Amazon moved production for future seasons to the United Kingdom, where filming for the second season began in October 2022.

The Lord of the Rings: The Rings of Power premiered on September 1, 2022, with the first two episodes, which Amazon stated had the most viewers for a Prime Video premiere. The rest of the eight-episode first season ran until October 14. It has received generally positive reviews from critics, although responses from audiences, including vocal Tolkien fans, were mixed. The second season is expected to be released in 2024.

Premise 
Set thousands of years before the events of The Hobbit and The Lord of the Rings, the series is based on author J. R. R. Tolkien's history of Middle-earth. It begins during a time of relative peace and covers all the major events of Middle-earth's Second Age: the forging of the Rings of Power, the rise of the Dark Lord Sauron, the fall of the island kingdom of Númenor, and the last alliance between Elves and Men. These events take place over thousands of years in Tolkien's original stories but are condensed for the series.

Episodes

Season 1 (2022)

Season 2 
 

Charlotte Brändström is directing four episodes of the second season, with Sanaa Hamri and Louise Hooper directing two each. It is expected to be released in 2024.

Cast and characters 

 Morfydd Clark as Galadriel: an Elven warrior who believes evil is returning to Middle-earth. The showrunners based her depiction on a letter in which Tolkien described a young Galadriel as being of "Amazon disposition".
 Lenny Henry as Sadoc Burrows: a Harfoot elder. Henry described the Harfoots as "the traditional Tolkien little guy... the little people in this world provide comedy but also get to be incredibly brave".
 Sara Zwangobani as Marigold Brandyfoot: a Harfoot and Nori's mother
 Dylan Smith as Largo Brandyfoot: a Harfoot and Nori's father
 Markella Kavenagh as Elanor "Nori" Brandyfoot: a Harfoot with a "yearning for adventure"
 Megan Richards as Poppy Proudfellow: a curious Harfoot
 Robert Aramayo as Elrond: a half-Elven architect and politician. Elrond goes from being optimistic and eager to world-weary and closed-off throughout the series.
 Benjamin Walker as Gil-galad: the High King of the Elves who rules from the realm of Lindon. Walker highlighted the character's "odd gift of foresight. He's prescient, and... can kind of feel the pulse of evil rising."
 Ismael Cruz Córdova as Arondir: a Silvan Elf with a forbidden love for the human healer Bronwyn, similar to Tolkien's love stories about Beren and Lúthien and Aragorn and Arwen
 Nazanin Boniadi as Bronwyn: a human mother and healer who owns an apothecary in the Southlands
 Tyroe Muhafidin as Theo: Bronwyn's son
 Charles Edwards as Celebrimbor: the Elven smith who forges the Rings of Power, he is a "brilliant artisan" known throughout Middle-earth
 Daniel Weyman as the stranger: one of the Istari who falls from the sky in a flaming meteor and befriends Nori
 Owain Arthur as Durin IV: the prince of the Dwarven city of Khazad-dûm
 Charlie Vickers as Sauron: the former lieutenant of the Dark Lord Morgoth who disguises himself as the human Halbrand to deceive Galadriel and the rest of Middle-earth
 Sophia Nomvete as Disa: Durin IV's wife and princess of the Dwarven city of Khazad-dûm. Disa and the other female Dwarves have facial hair, but they don't have large beards like the male Dwarves in the series.
 Lloyd Owen as Elendil: a Númenórean sailor and Isildur's father who will eventually be a leader in the last alliance between Elves and Men
 Cynthia Addai-Robinson as Míriel: the queen regent of Númenor, an island kingdom ruled by Men descended from Elrond's half-Elven brother Elros
 Trystan Gravelle as Pharazôn: a Númenórean advisor to queen regent Míriel
 Maxim Baldry as Isildur: a Númenórean sailor who will eventually become a warrior and king. The writers wanted Isildur's story to end in tragedy rather than foolishness as in the source material.
 Ema Horvath as Eärien: Isildur's sister, who was created for the series
 Joseph Mawle (season 1) and Sam Hazeldine (season 2) as Adar: a fallen Elf and the leader of the Orcs
 Leon Wadham as Kemen: Pharazôn's son

Production

Development 
In July 2017, a lawsuit was settled between Warner Bros., the studio behind Peter Jackson's The Lord of the Rings and The Hobbit film trilogies, and the estate of author J. R. R. Tolkien upon whose books those films were based. HBO pitched a remake of the Lord of the Rings films which Tolkien's estate was not interested in, and Netflix pitched multiple connected series focusing on characters such as Aragorn and Gandalf which reportedly "completely freaked out the estate". Amazon did not pitch a specific story but promised to work closely with the Tolkien Estate so they could "protect Tolkien's legacy", which they were unable to do with previous adaptations. Amazon emerged as the frontrunner by September 2017 and entered negotiations. Uncommonly for programming developments at the studio, Amazon CEO Jeff Bezos was personally involved with the negotiations. Bezos was a personal fan of The Lord of the Rings, and had previously given Amazon Studios a mandate to develop an ambitious fantasy series of comparable scale to HBO's Game of Thrones.

Industry commentators described this amount—before any production costs and without any creative talent attached to the project—as "insane", although some considered the project to be more of a reputational risk for Amazon than a financial one due to Bezos's wealth. Amazon's streaming service Amazon Prime Video gave a multi-season commitment to the series that was believed to be for five seasons, with the possibility of a spin-off series as well. Despite this, Prime Video had to give a formal greenlight to future seasons before work could begin on them. Warner Bros. Television was not involved in the project because Amazon Studios wanted to produce it themselves. Amazon was working with the Tolkien Estate, the Tolkien Trust, HarperCollins, and New Line Cinema (the Warner Bros. division who produced the films). New Line was reportedly included to allow the use of material from the films. The Tolkien Estate imposed creative restrictions on the series, and the deal stipulated that production begin within two years.

The first season was reported to focus on a young Aragorn in May 2018. Jennifer Salke, the head of Amazon Studios, said a month later that the deal for the series had only just been officially completed.  The studio met more than 30 potential writers, including the Russo brothers and Anthony McCarten, and asked for story pitches based on anything in Tolkien's The Hobbit, The Lord of the Rings, and its appendices. These included prequel stories focused on characters such as Aragorn, Gimli, and Gandalf. J. D. Payne and Patrick McKay pitched a series that explored the major events of Middle-earth's Second Age, thousands of years before The Lord of the Rings, including the forging of the Rings of Power, the rise of the Dark Lord Sauron, the fall of the island kingdom of Númenor, and the last alliance between Elves and Men. These events were covered in a five-minute prologue in the Lord of the Rings films, and the pair wanted to expand this into "50 hours of television". In contrast with the other experienced writers being interviewed, Payne and McKay had only done unproduced or uncredited writing. They were championed to Amazon by director J. J. Abrams who worked with them on an unproduced Star Trek film, and were hired to develop the series in July 2018. Payne said their pitch felt like "an amazing, untold story" that was "worthy of Tolkien", and McKay added, "We didn't want to do a side thing. A spinoff or the origin story of something else. We wanted to find a huge Tolkienian mega epic, and Amazon" agreed.

Jackson said in December that he and his film producing partners would read some scripts for the series and offer notes on them, but he later stated that this did not happen. Amazon explained that the deal to acquire the television rights for The Lord of the Rings required them to keep the series distinct from Jackson's films, and the Tolkien Estate were reportedly against Jackson's involvement in the project. Payne and McKay were confirmed as showrunners and executive producers in July 2019, when the project's full creative team was revealed. Additional executive producers include Lindsey Weber, Callum Greene, J. A. Bayona, Belén Atienza, Justin Doble, Jason Cahill, Gennifer Hutchison, Bruce Richmond, and Sharon Tal Yguado. Prime Video officially ordered a second season in November 2019, and announced the series' full title, The Lord of the Rings: The Rings of Power, in January 2022. Payne and McKay felt the title could "live on the spine of a book next to J.R.R. Tolkien's other classics".

Writing 
The Lord of the Rings and The Hobbit are set during the Third Age, while the First and Second Ages are explored in other Tolkien writings such as The Silmarillion, Unfinished Tales, and The History of Middle-earth. Because Amazon only bought the television rights to The Lord of the Rings and The Hobbit, the writers had to identify all of the references to the Second Age in those books and create a story that bridged those passages. These are primarily in the appendices of The Lord of the Rings, but also in certain chapters and songs. Tolkien's estate was prepared to veto any changes from his established narrative, including anything that contradicted what Tolkien wrote in other works. The writers were free to add characters or details, and worked with the estate and Tolkien lore experts to ensure these were still "Tolkienian". They referenced letters that Tolkien wrote about his works and mythology for additional context on the setting and characters. Simon Tolkien, a novelist and the grandson of J.R.R. Tolkien, consulted on the series and helped develop its story and character arcs. He is credited as a "series consultant". The showrunners disagreed with suggestions that the series was only "vaguely connected" to Tolkien's writings. McKay said they felt it was "deeply, deeply connected" and a "story we're stewarding that was here before us and was waiting in those books" to be told. A disclaimer is featured in the series' end credits stating that some elements are "inspired by, though not contained in, the original source material".

Payne and McKay knew the series was expected to run for five seasons and were able to plan elements of the final season, including the series' final shot, while working on the first. Because they were unable to adapt dialogue from Tolkien's Second Age stories, the writers attempted to repurpose dialogue that they did have access to while also taking inspiration from religious texts and poetry. They tailored the dialogue to different characters using dialects and poetic meters. Leith McPherson returned from the Hobbit films as dialect coach and noted that Tolkien's fictional languages evolve over time, so they are different for the Second Age compared to the Third. The series' Elves mostly speak Quenya, a language described as "Elvish Latin" that is often just used for spellcasting in the Third Age. Dwarvish and Orkish are also heard, along with English, Scottish, and Irish dialects. The biggest deviation made from Tolkien's works, which was approved by the estate and lore experts, was to condense the Second Age from thousands of years to a short period of time. This avoided human characters frequently dying due to their relatively short lifespans and allowed major characters from later in the timeline to be introduced earlier in the series. The showrunners considered using non-linear storytelling instead, but felt this would prevent the audience from emotionally investing in the series. They said many real-life historical dramas also condense events like this, and felt they were still respecting the "spirit and feeling" of Tolkien's writings.

After the series was revealed to have hired Jennifer Ward-Lealand as an intimacy coordinator, Tolkien fans expressed concern that it would include Game of Thrones-style graphic sex and violence. Payne and McKay said this would not be the case and the series would be family-friendly. They hoped to evoke the tone of Tolkien's books, which can be "intense, sometimes quite political, sometimes quite sophisticated—but it's also heartwarming and life-affirming and optimistic." They also said they did not want to be influenced by modern politics, aspiring to tell a timeless story that matched Tolkien's own intention to create a mythology that would always be applicable.

Casting 
Salke stated in June 2018 that the series would include some characters from the films, and the showrunners intended for the new actors to look like they could feasibly grow up to be their film counterparts. In January 2020, Amazon announced that the series' main cast would include Robert Aramayo, Owain Arthur, Nazanin Boniadi, Tom Budge, Morfydd Clark, Ismael Cruz Córdova, Ema Horvath, Markella Kavenagh, Joseph Mawle, Tyroe Muhafidin, Sophia Nomvete, Megan Richards, Dylan Smith, Charlie Vickers, and Daniel Weyman. Aramayo and Clark were cast as younger versions of the film characters Elrond and Galadriel, respectively. Amazon's co-head of television Vernon Sanders noted that there were still some key roles that had yet to be filled. In December, Amazon announced 20 new cast members: Cynthia Addai-Robinson, Maxim Baldry, Ian Blackburn, Kip Chapman, Anthony Crum, Maxine Cunliffe, Trystan Gravelle, Lenny Henry, Thusitha Jayasundera, Fabian McCallum, Simon Merrells, Geoff Morrell, Peter Mullan, Lloyd Owen, Augustus Prew, Peter Tait, Alex Tarrant, Leon Wadham, Benjamin Walker, and Sara Zwangobani. Baldry, Owen, and Walker portray Isildur, Elendil, and Gil-galad, respectively, characters that appeared in the films during flashbacks. Budge revealed in March 2021 that Amazon had decided to recast his character after filming several episodes. Charles Edwards was cast to replace him that July. Will Fletcher, Amelie Child-Villiers, and Beau Cassidy were also added to the cast then.

In early December 2022, Sam Hazeldine was revealed to have replaced Joseph Mawle in the role of Adar for the second season. Amazon also announced the casting of Gabriel Akuwudike, Yasen "Zates" Atour, Ben Daniels, Amelia Kenworthy, Nia Towle, and Nicholas Woodeson. A week later, Amazon further announced the casting of Oliver Alvin-Wilson, Stuart Bowman, Gavi Singh Chera, William Chubb, Kevin Eldon, Will Keen, Selina Lo, and Calam Lynch.

Design 
Illustrator and concept artist John Howe said in August 2019 that the series would remain faithful to the designs of the film trilogies. Payne and McKay later clarified that the series is not a direct continuation of the films, per Amazon's deal for the series, but they did not want it to "clash" with the films and tried to have similar designs. They took advantage of Howe's experience working on Jackson's adaptations, as well as that of costume designer Kate Hawley who worked on the Hobbit films. Other influences included the 1977 animated television adaptation of The Hobbit by Rankin/Bass. Howe had filled 40 sketchbooks with drawings for the project by May 2022.

Rick Heinrichs was initially announced as production designer, but was eventually replaced by Ramsey Avery. Avery said his biggest challenge was making Middle-earth feel both familiar and new. He approached this by attempting to create a "vibrant and rich and golden" world that was distinct from the films, in which "everything is on its decline, and it's fading". Kristian Milsted took over as production designer for the season season.

Filming 
In June 2018, Salke said the series could be produced in New Zealand, where the film trilogies were made, but Amazon was also willing to shoot in other countries as long as they could "provide those locations in a really authentic way, because we want it to look incredible". Amazon confirmed in September 2019 that filming for the first season would take place in New Zealand. Scotland had also been considered as a location. Filming for the season began in Auckland in February 2020, with J. A. Bayona directing the first two episodes. Production was placed on hold in mid-March due to the COVID-19 pandemic, and this shutdown segued into an already planned production break that allowed footage from the first two episodes to be reviewed and writing on the second season to begin. Filming resumed at the end of September. Wayne Che Yip and Charlotte Brändström directed the rest of the season's episodes. Around a third of filming took place on location around New Zealand. Production for the first season officially wrapped on August 2, 2021.

The week after filming ended for the first season, Amazon announced that it was moving production of the series to the United Kingdom starting with the second season. Factors that played a role in the change included Amazon already heavily investing in UK studio space for other productions as well as New Zealand's restrictive pandemic-era border policies. The Tolkien Estate also wanted the series to be filmed in the UK since Tolkien was inspired by locations there when writing his books. Pre-production for the second season was expected to begin in the UK in the second quarter of 2022, taking place concurrently with post-production for the first season which was continuing in New Zealand until June 2022. Filming on the second season began on October 3, with Brändström, Sanaa Hamri, and Louise Hooper directing.

Visual effects 
Company 3 created a post-production environment in the cloud that all work and assets for the series went through, allowing producer Ron Ames to manage all of post-production remotely. This became a necessity during the pandemic, and helped give the production a head-start on the second season when it moved to the UK. The primary visual effects vendors for the first season were Wētā FX, returning from Jackson's films, and Industrial Light & Magic. All the vendors were overseen by visual effects supervisor Jason Smith. The season's effects include characters appearing at different scales, augmented environments, creatures, and magic.

The opening title sequence was co-directed by Katrina Crawford and Mark Bashore of the creative studio Plains of Yonder. They did not see any material from the series when starting work and instead took inspiration from Tolkien. Based on the author's creation story in which the world is created from music, the pair suggested the title sequence be "built from the world of sound". They investigated the science of cymatics, using a homemade Chladni plate and slow motion iPhone footage to test what shapes could be formed with sand particles by the vibrations of different sounds (including Gregorian chants, Angelic music, rock and roll, and whale calls). The Plains of Yonder visual effects team then attempted to replicate the "flawed, wild motion" of the real photography for shots that feature iconography from Tolkien's writings such as the Two Trees of Valinor, the eight-pointed star associated with the character Fëanor, the geography of Middle-earth, and each set of the Rings of Power (nine human rings, seven Dwarven rings, three Elven rings, and the One Ring). The sequence took seven months to complete.

Music 

Howard Shore, the composer for the Lord of the Rings and Hobbit films, was reported to be in discussions with Amazon about working on the series in September 2020. He was said to be interested in developing musical themes but not necessarily composing the entire score. Shore was confirmed to be in talks for the series a year later, when composer Bear McCreary was reported to be involved as well. Their hiring was officially announced in July 2022, with McCreary composing the score and Shore writing the main title theme. McCreary was contractually prohibited from quoting any themes that Shore wrote for the films.

McCreary said the series was a "once-in-a-lifetime opportunity" to work on such an ambitious score, and he hoped to create a "continuity of concept" between the series and Shore's work on the films. He wrote more than 15 new themes for the series. Though Shore's main theme was composed independently of McCreary's work, McCreary felt it "fit together so beautifully" with his own music. A soundtrack album featuring Shore's main theme and selections from McCreary's score for the first season was released on August 19, 2022. Additional albums featuring McCreary's full score for each episode were also released.

Marketing 
Early promotions for the series on social media used several maps of Middle-earth's Second Age, as well as excerpts from the novel The Lord of the Rings. The maps were designed and created by illustrator John Howe and overseen by Tolkien scholar Tom Shippey to ensure they were accurate to Tolkien's works. Howe and Shippey spent a lot of time working on the maps, which were based on Tolkien's maps of Númenor during the Second Age as well as his maps of the Third Age. Despite their efforts, HarperCollins received complaints from fans shortly after the maps were released online regarding two mistakes that were made on them.

Amazon considered the reveal of the series' full title in January 2022 to be crucial due to it beginning the series' marketing campaign at the start of its premiere year. Instead of just using visual effects to create the title reveal, the studio released an announcement video in which the letters of the title are physically cast from molten metal while an excerpt of the "Ring Verse" from The Lord of the Rings is read in voiceover. The video was directed by Klaus Obermeyer, who worked with special effects supervisor Lee Nelson under advisement by veteran special effects supervisor Douglas Trumbull. They filmed the video with foundryman Landon Ryan in late 2021 in Los Angeles, after experimenting with different combinations of metals, as well as sparkler dust, argon pours, and liquid hydrogen, to create the desired look. The final metal was a mixture of bronze and aluminum which was poured into moulds of compressed sand that could be used multiple times. The pouring was filmed at 5,000 frames per second with a Phantom Flex4K camera so it could be shown in ultra-slow motion. For the final title card, the forged letters were inscribed with Elvish writing and placed on a large piece of redwood. Staff from the Tolkien fan website TheOneRing.net and entertainment journalists were invited by Amazon to watch the filming of the video. Prologue Films provided previsualization for the sequence as well as compositing and additional visual effects. They recreated the final title card digitally, taking care to maintain the "integrity of the live action shots and lighting".

A new book chronicling the events of Middle-earth's Second Age was announced in June 2022. Titled The Fall of Númenor, it was compiled and edited by Tolkien scholar Brian Sibley from Tolkien's writings about the Second Age. The book was published in November 2022 following the release of The Rings of Power first season, to capitalize on new interest in Tolkien's works arising from the series' release.

Release 
The Lord of the Rings: The Rings of Power premiered on Prime Video in the United States on September 1, 2022. Episodes were released in more than 240 countries and territories at the same time as the U.S.

Reception

Viewership 
Amazon announced that The Rings of Power had been watched by 25 million viewers globally in the first 24 hours that the first two episodes were available on Prime Video. The company stated that this was the biggest premiere ever for the service. It was the first time that Amazon had publicly stated viewership data for Prime Video and the company did not specify how much of an episode a user needed to watch to count as a viewer. By December 2022 the series had been watched by more than 100 million viewers globally and was Prime Video's most watched series ever. Sanders called it "a tremendous success... it has more than paid off".

Critical response 

The review aggregator website Rotten Tomatoes reported an 83% approval score for the first season based on 475 reviews. The website's critical consensus reads, "It may not yet be the One Show to Rule Them All, but The Rings of Power enchants with its opulent presentation and deeply-felt rendering of Middle-earth." Metacritic, which uses a weighted average, assigned a score of 71 out of 100 based on reviews from 40 critics, indicating "generally favorable reviews".

Comparisons with House of the Dragon 
Critics, fans, and publications have drawn comparisons between The Lord of the Rings: The Rings of Power and fantasy series House of the Dragon on HBO. House of the Dragon is a prequel series set before Game of Thrones, while The Rings of Power is a prequel series set thousands of years before the events of J. R. R. Tolkien's The Hobbit and The Lord of the Rings. The similar fantasy genre, close release dates, and extensive fan bases were cited in articles comparing the two series. Commentators and fans alike have described these comparisons as the "biggest battle in TV history". More negative criticism from the two fan bases also included the character diversity, with some publications describing some of the criticism as racist. George R. R. Martin, the author of the A Song of Ice and Fire series which House of the Dragon is based on, stated that although he hopes both shows are successful, he wants to see House of the Dragon "succeed more." Lindsey Weber, an executive producer for The Rings of Power, stated that the head-to-head conflict between the two shows are "totally manufactured by the media for headlines". Show co-creator J. D. Payne said the only competition he sees is with "themselves"; however, he wishes well for "anyone else working on storytelling".

Financially, the budget for The Rings of Power is almost $450 million more than House of the Dragon. Both series fared successfully in the ratings. According to Nielsen and first-party data, The Rings of Powers first two episodes had more than 1.25 billion minutes of streaming minutes after three days of availability. In comparison, a few hours after the episode two premiere of House of the Dragon, the show had reached more than 1.06 billion minutes of streaming minutes. Following the season finale for House of the Dragon, weekly streaming viewership passed 1 billion viewing minutes for the first time. According to Nielsen data, The Rings of Power has a higher percentage of older viewers, with more than 70% of viewers being over the age of 35. Following both series finales, streaming viewership for The Rings of Power decreased throughout the first season while House of the Dragon viewership increased. Despite the age gap in viewership, commentators have stated one of the reasons both shows did well was the consistent release schedule that helped create social-media buzz. Both shows have highlighted the "streaming wars" between both Amazon and HBO and the entertainment industry as a whole.

Accolades

Notes

References

External links 
 
 
 

 

2020s American drama television series
2022 American television series debuts
Amazon Prime Video original programming
American action adventure television series
American fantasy drama television series
American prequel television series
English-language television shows
High fantasy television series
Serial drama television series
Television productions suspended due to the COVID-19 pandemic
Television series by Amazon Studios
Television series by New Line Television
Television series set in Middle-earth
Television shows filmed in New Zealand
Television shows filmed in the United Kingdom